Below are listed the archbishops of Roman Catholic Archdiocese of Košice.

See also 

Lists of patriarchs, archbishops, and bishops

References 

Clergy from Košice
Košice
Kosice